Akpan Utuk was a strategic and successful colonel in the Biafran Army.

Biafran War involvement
In 1967, with the start of the Nigerian Civil War Utuk, a native of Ibibio, joined the Biafran Army and quickly rose in ranks. Utuk is said to have fought at most of the large-scale battles during the war. When Utuk was made colonel he was put into command of the Biafran 16th Division to defend the city of Owerri from the oncoming Nigerian Army. When General Benjamin Adekunle decided to invade Aba instead of Owerri, he was pleased and decided to stay back and let Major Timothy Onwuatuegwu handle the Nigerians. After separate battle at Aba and Umuahia Utuk did not expect the Nigerian Army to arrive. On September 17, 1968, General Benjamin Adekunle attacked Owerri. Utuk and his men overpowered Adekunle's troops and forced them to flee to Oguta, but when Utuk arrived in Oguta he was met with heavy firepower from Adekunle's troops.

Utuk fled to Umuahia leaving Owerri open to occupation. Immediately after the occupation of Owerri Biafran President Odumegwu Ojukwu had made himself a military general and ordered Utuk and Major Onwuatuegwu to invade and retake Owerri. The outrage over Major Onwuatuegwu's combat death was so great that he commanded that sector ordered the summary execution of the soldier who had deliberately killed Onwuatuegwu instead of taking him as a prisoner of war. After seven months of heavy fighting Utuk is able to recapture Owerri. After Owerri was retaken Ojukwu sent Utuk and Onwuatuegwu to Umuahia for defense. On March 22, 1969, Nigerian General Mohammed Shuwa invaded modern-day Abia State with 8,500 men. A large force of MiG-17's bombed the towns of Uzuakoli and Arochukwu, but did not damage any Biafran defenses. On April 22 Shuwa was able to break through Onwuatuegwu's line of defense and was able to take Umuahia. Utuk decided to invade the city and after four hours of Nigerian occupation, Utuk was able to retake the city.

Disappearance
Nine months later, when Biafra surrendered to Nigeria, Utuk was last seen at a party in Lagos in early 1970.

See also 
 List of people who disappeared

Sources

References

External links
Philip-effiong.com

1970s missing person cases
Date of death unknown
Ibibio people
Military personnel of the Nigerian Civil War
Missing people
Missing person cases in Nigeria
People from Biafra
Year of birth missing